(18 February 192421 January 2015) was a Taiwanese and Japanese novelist, translator and cultural critic. He is best known for his historical fictions and mystery novels based on Chinese and Asian history, including First Opium War, Chinese History, Ryukyu Wind. He won numerous literary awards, including the Yoshikawa Eiji Prize for Literature and the Naoki Prize.

Major works
Roots of Dried Grass (枯草の根)
House Three Colors - Showa Treasure Mysteries (三色の家), Fusosha
The Sapphire Lion Incense Burner (青玉獅子香炉)
Chinese History (中国の歴史)
Ryukyu Wind (琉球の風)
Genghis Khan's Family (チンギス・ハーンの一族)

Awards

 The 23rd Mystery Writers of Japan Award
 The 7th Edogawa Rampo Prize in 1961 for 枯草の根
 The 60th Naoki Prize (1968下) for The Sapphire Lion Incense Burner
 The 26th Yoshikawa Eiji Prize for Literature (1992) for

See also

 Ryōtarō Shiba
 Japanese literature
 List of Japanese authors

References

External links
INTERVIEW/ Chin Shunshin: History is invariably written by conquerors at Asahi Shimbun

1924 births
People from Kobe
Japanese historical novelists
Japanese mystery writers
Mystery Writers of Japan Award winners
Edogawa Rampo Prize winners
Taiwanese male novelists
Japanese fantasy writers
Japanese people of Taiwanese descent
Osaka University alumni
2015 deaths
Japanese critics
20th-century novelists
20th-century Japanese male writers